Elmira District Secondary School (EDSS) is a secondary school serving the town of Elmira, Ontario, Canada and the surrounding area. The school is run by the Waterloo Region District School Board.

Continuation school
The first secondary education in Elmira was a "continuation school" that began in 1896. Classes were held in one room in a public school and continued for only a short time. Education until that point in Elmira stopped at grade eight. Interest declined in the classes and higher education stopped for a period of time. In 1908, another attempt was made to again begin classes for a continuation group, but again stopped shortly after in December 1910. Three years later the trustees were asked to try again. On September 6, 1914, under the principalship of Alma Crawforth of Whitby, Ontario, the continuation school started once more. It resided in an unoccupied class in Riverside Public School. The second year a second teacher, Margaret MacDonald was added due to the success of the programme.

Transportation to the school for some was by train. The first graduating class was in June 1917. Twelve students passed the middle school or grade 12 examinations. It was written that the cost of maintenance per pupil in 1928 was $50 per year.

History

Building the new high school 
Six days later the declaration of the purchase was made. Apparently, this land was owned by a Mr. Edward Beir. Later it was revealed that not three, but  were actually purchased for the school site. It is not clear whether someone like F. W. Warren, the architect, Oscar Wiles, the contractor or some other citizen made a motion to obtain another .

This piece of property was a section originally purchased by Mr. Edward Bristow in 1832. It was a solid timber forest. Mr. Bristow originally paid one dollar an acre to Mr. David Musselman. Mr. Bristow was the first settler and henceforth Elmira's former name of Bristow's Corners acknowledged this. The funds for the purchase of the land were handed to the board by the town council in May. The Public School Board provided an additional room in order to meet the demand for more space which would be needed when the school would be opened.

Before the sod was turned in June 1938, fourteen years had passed since the original land purchase. This delay can be attributed to many factors. The war boom showed signs of recession and the Board became cautious. Initial pressure from the Education Department became less insistent. Accommodations at the present High School (Continuation School) were being met. The first chairman of the first official High School Board, George Klinck, turned the sod on June 28, 1938 for the new school. R.H. Vice, present chairman of the School Board laid the cornerstone, July 21, 1938.

The original cost of the school was approximately $188,080. According to the book "The Development and Progress of Education in Elmira and Vicinity" George Klinck describes the school in the following manner: "It's distinguished, classical and dignified appearance, its favourable position which admits plenty of room on all sides, its solidity and durability, its freedom from questionable and perishable decorations, and its unresistable attractiveness" added to the outstanding features of the school. The remainder will be used for play and recreation plots. The trustees have, wisely, consulted a professional landscape artist who has submitted a plan. There will be planted a variety of fruit, shade and forest trees, shrubs and flowers in accordance with the artist's plans, as soon as the season opens. The gym was regarded as 'one of the most attractive rooms in the school.' It provided the community with one more possible venue for civic gatherings. The general shop was seen to be a remarkable addition to the school. Klinck states that it "will be enthusiastically welcomed by the boys who are gifted with mechanical and utilitarian proclivities Combinations of practicability with academic education is the ideal goal for the ambitions of a practical matter of fact community. Parents should realize this and give their boys and girls a chance."

The school was officially opened on December 8, 1938 by the Hon. Dr. Simpson, Minister of Education.

Early days 
Some of the courses taught were General Academics, Junior Matriculation, Upper School in French, Latin and German, English History, Biology, Mathematics, Commercial Course, General Shop and Mechanics, Farm Mechanics, Woodworking, Sheet Metal, and Machine Drafting.

The principal was R.R. Mansz. The teachers were Mr. E.W. Kendall, Miss E. Cruickshanks, Miss D. Legree, Miss L.M. Bell, and Miss C. McDonagh.

Post-war 
In his booklet The Development of Secondary Education in the Elmira District, former principal H. B. Disbrowe writes: "it was soon after the end of the war that demand for equality of educational opportunity led to the establishment of the first enlarged high school districts."

In 1947 there were lengthy negotiations between the councils of the town of Elmira  and the townships of Woolwich, Wellesley, and Peel. As a result of these talks it was agreed to dissolve the old Elmira High School Board and establish a new Elmira District High School Board. The new board assumed office in January 1948 and the school became known by a new name, "Elmira District High School."

In 1948, classes were considered to be large. A typical grade 9 class had 41 pupils and a grade 13 class had 40 pupils. Discipline was tight and was expected and respected by parents.

The school song was "EHS Is Supreme Throughout The Land!" School colours were blue and white, and for gym students wore navy tunics with white blouses, socks and gym shoes "without fail" or they lost valuable marks for being late in the gym and being improperly attired. The school team was the Blue Bombers. Around 1950, the school colours were changed to green and gray. Students made their own green corduroy shorts in Home Economics and bought gray shiny T-shirts with green trim.

In the early 1950s a social event for the school was Teen Town. Young ladies wore Gibson girl blouses (white) with black kerchiefs tied under the collar to make a bow at the front, and black gored skirts with crinoline slips holding them out; and ankle socks and saddle shoes.

In 1954 at a cost of $149,990. a four-room addition was constructed. At this point there were 275 students in attendance. The architect for this project was R.C. Reider of Kitchener. Wunder Construction of Kitchener was granted the tender for $136,848. After miscellaneous expenses were added on, the total came $18.00 short of the limit the board would spend of $158,800.

In 1959, ten to twelve rooms and another gymnasium were added due to growth in enrollment. (the number of rooms varies with different written accounts.) This last addition contained a laboratory, classrooms and a lady teacher's room. The new gym would be used by the boys and the older gym by the girls. The basement also included a new industrial arts classroom. The cost of this addition was $488,008 and gave an 85% increase in space.

1960s 
The new addition was officially opened at the end of April 1960 by Dr. S.D. Rendall, Superintendent of Secondary Education for Ontario. In his speech to nearly 900, Rendall said that nearly 60 out of every 100 students who got to high school never graduate.

Cadet inspection was a major event in the early 1960s. Everyone male and female, unless he/she had a religious exemption or was in Grade 13, was required to participate. The guys wore wool uniforms and the girls wore blazers. The cadets marched down Snyder Avenue, along Church Street, and back up Arthur Street before inspection. Participants got off classes to practice and after inspection, the evening ended up being quite a big event with a dance at the end.

Teen Town was a regular event and well attended. Ernie Kendall was the sponsor and kept things on the "up and up." (Some will remember the year that Ernie tried to limit the close dancing by going out on the floor with a ruler to measure the distance between heads.[how far apart were they supposed to be?])

In 1963, a vocational wing was added on. This addition was perceived by the board as a move that was long overdue. It felt that the courses that were offered at that time were mainly geared 10 help prepare students for university entrance. These new programmes that would be available would better prepare a student with marketable skills for the job force. At that point in Canadian history, the market for unskilled labourers was rapidly diminishing due to automation in industry and its rapid growth.

Valued at approximately $480,080. the new addition provided additional extensions to the existing facilities, an agricultural greenhouse, an electrical or carpentry shop, a drafting room, an automotive shop, a machine shop, and three classrooms.

The entire addition and equipment were covered by a full grant with the Federal Government providing 75% and the Provincial Government 25%.

The name of the school was changed to Elmira District Secondary School at the opening on January 17 and 18, 1963. Minister of Labor Charles Starr and O. W. (Mike) Weichel M.P. for Waterloo North were invited as guests of honour.

The school curriculum now included Arts and Science, Business and Commerce, and Science, Technology and Trades. Within each branch there were five year courses and four year courses. In addition there were also occupational courses for boys and girls who only have one or two years to spend at school. The new Technical wing was the most up-to-date building of its kind in Ontario. It contained a Technical Director's office, Drafting Room, Machine Shop, Electrical Shop, Automotive Shop, Diversified Trades Shop, Greenhouse, Industrial Sewing Room, Nursing Room, Business Machines Room, Typing Room and Classrooms.

H.B. Disbrowe, principal, felt that the changes in the secondary school programme, which were being implemented in Elmira, were the most sweeping to occur in Ontario.

All this has sprung forth from a continuation school which started in 1896. Many people contributed to the education in Elmira. As George Klinck wrote, "Suffice it to state that the school stands as a tribute to the dutifulness and enterprise of the citizens of the town, to the ability of the architect and to the skill of the contractors and their helpers. May it long stand."

2000s 
In 2006, the school began to remove asbestos from the walls and ceilings of the school, and added an elevator - luckily - apparently, the old part of the school was built on dirt, with no foundation beneath, so before the elevator was installed by Delta Elevators, a foundation was poured.  The construction is finally over and the artworks are going back up on the walls.  Another new piece of information is that the school has bought a piece of land across the street, formerly the Elmira Raceway, and now has a new sports field including a new track and field facility. There is also a large scoreboard at the new field.

Principals 
A. Mansz    (1939–1940)
G. Currie   (1940–1945)
H. Disbrowe (1945–1965)
M. Duke     (1965–1973)
R. Milliken (1973–1981)
I. Demsey   (1981–1982)
H. Gossen   (1982–1989)
J. Furlong  (1989–1996)
T. Birss    (1996–1998)
R. McPhail  (1998–2002)
G. Ayre     (2003–2007)
P. Rubenschuh (2007–2008)
M. Richer   (2008–2011)
P. Morgan   (2011-2017)
B. Marsh    (2017-    )

Notable alumni
 Malcolm Gladwell  Canadian journalist, author, public speaker, writer for The New Yorker since 1996.
 Bruce Headlam  Canadian Journalist, Media Desk Editor of The New York Times.
 Keith Heller  head of Canadian National Railway east division, and DB Schenker Rail co-chair in Europe
 Terry Martin  ice hockey player
 Roger Martin   Dean of the Rotman School of Management at the University of Toronto from 1998 to 2013 and an author of several business books.
 Paul Frey  opera singer.
 Paul Straus  president and director of Home Hardware.
 Garrett Rank  referee in the National Hockey League, professional golfer.
 Ken Seiling  chair for the Regional Municipality of Waterloo from 1985–2018.
 Sarah Mercey  animator.
 Lucas Bryant  actor

See also
List of high schools in Ontario

References
This account of the beginnings of education at EDSS was written in conjunction with the writings of George Klinck and Frank Bristow. Some pertinent details are missing. Perhaps future attempts will uncover these facts and fill in the gaps in this account.

External links
Official website

Waterloo Region District School Board
High schools in the Regional Municipality of Waterloo
Educational institutions established in 1939
Woolwich, Ontario
1939 establishments in Ontario